Bad Liar may refer to:
"Bad Liar" (Selena Gomez song), 2017
"Bad Liar" (Imagine Dragons song), 2019